Samuel "Sam" Gene Kooistra (August 18, 1935 – September 18, 2010) was an American water polo player who competed in the 1956 Summer Olympics.

He was born in Chicago and is the younger brother of William Kooistra.

Kooistra was a member of the American water polo team which finished fifth in the 1956 Olympic tournament. He played four matches.

Kooistra was a member of the American water polo team that finished first in the 1959 Pan American Games tournament.

In 1977, he was inducted into the USA Water Polo Hall of Fame.

References

External links
 
 Sam Kooistra's obituary

1935 births
2010 deaths
American male water polo players
Olympic water polo players of the United States
Place of death missing
Water polo players from Chicago
Water polo players at the 1956 Summer Olympics